QuickFIX is an open source, cross-platform (BSD licensed) FIX messaging engine written in C++. As it is cross-platform, it runs on Windows, Mac OS X, Linux, Solaris, and FreeBSD. Several implementation variants of the engine exist, including

 QuickFIX/J, a Java open source (also BSD licensed) implementation of the engine. 
 QuickFIX/n, a C# and .NET open source (also BSD licensed) implementation of the engine. 
 QuickFIX/Go, a Go open source (also BSD licensed) implementation of the engine.

The developers also offer QuickFIX Log Viewer, designed to parse FIX messages out of a given file, even if there are other messages within, making it flexible and usable on more general log files. Commercial support for the QuickFIX engine is available from third parties.

History 
QuickFIX was created by Oren Miller and a small ThoughtWorks team alongside Jim Downs of Connamara Systems and was launched in 2002. The creators were honored with an award from the FIX Trading Community in 2014 for the impact the project had on the global trading community.

References

External links
 QuickFIX official website
 QuickFIX/J official website
 QuickFIX/n official website
 QuickFIX/Go official website
 QuickFIX Messenger official website

Network protocols
Financial markets
Cross-platform free software